Songs About This and That is a studio album by English saxophonist John Surman with Norwegian vocalist Karin Krog that was recorded on 23 and 24 April 2013 and released by Meantime on 29 November 2013.

Background 
A total of ten songs about «this and that», amounted commissioned works jointly composed by the duo Karin Krog and John Surman for the Vossajazz 2010. Nine of these is comprise this release. The critique Dave Gelly, of The Observer, in his review of the album Songs About This And That, states:
{| class="wikitable"
|-
|... These nine songs, jointly composed, bring out the special qualities of them both. Krog's apparently simple style has a clarity and precision that becomes more telling with the passage of time, while Surman never fails to surprise you with some new texture or sudden change of direction....
|}

 Reception The Guardian'' review awarded the album 4 stars.

Track listing 
All compositions by John Surman & Karin Krog
 "Mirror Song" (1:37)
 "Cherry Tree Song" (6:12)
 "Question Song" (6:24)
 "Circle Song" (5:47)
 "Happy Song" (5:58)
 "Moonlight Song" (6:51)
 "Rain Song" (7:25)
 "Pebble Song" (6:02)
 "Monk Song" (5:09)

Personnel 
 John Surman – soprano & baritone saxophones, bass clarinet, bass recorder
 Karin Krog – vocals
 Ivar Kolve – vibraphone
 Bjørn Klakegg – guitar, electronics
 Terje Gewelt – bass
 Tom Olstad – drums

Credits 
 Artwork & graphic design – Nina Regine Hjelle
 Producer – John Surman & Karin Krog
 Recording & Digital Mastering – Jan Erik Kongshaug

References

External links 
 Karin Krog 
 John Surman 

Karin Krog albums
John Surman albums
2013 albums